Kamen Ringu  is an Indian politician from Arunachal Pradesh who resurrected PPA. He was the President of the Arunachal Congress, a regional political party in the Indian state of Arunachal Pradesh. Currently he is associated with People's Party of Arunachal as chairman of the party.

References

Arunachal Pradesh politicians
Living people
Year of birth missing (living people)
Place of birth missing (living people)
Arunachal Congress politicians
People from Papum Pare district
People's Party of Arunachal politicians